Argyll (archaically Argyle,  in modern Gaelic), sometimes called Argyllshire, is a historic county and registration county of western Scotland.

Argyll is of ancient origin, and broadly corresponds to the ancient kingdom of  less the parts which were in Ireland. Argyll was also a medieval bishopric with its cathedral at Lismore, as well as an early modern earldom, elevated to become a dukedom in 1701 with the creation of the Duke of Argyll.

Argyll borders Inverness-shire to the north, Perthshire and Dunbartonshire to the east, and—separated by the Firth of Clyde—neighbours Renfrewshire and Ayrshire to the south-east, and Buteshire to the south.

Between 1890 and 1975, Argyll was an administrative county with a county council. The county town was historically Inveraray, but from its creation in 1890 the county council was based at Lochgilphead. Most of the historic county's territory is within the modern council area of Argyll and Bute, with the main differences being that the Morvern and Ardnamurchan areas from the historic county are now in the Highland council area, whilst the Isle of Bute and the Helensburgh area were not in historic Argyll but are now in the Argyll and Bute council area.

There was an Argyllshire constituency of the Parliament of Great Britain then Parliament of the United Kingdom from 1708 until 1983.

Name
The name derives from Old Irish , meaning "border region of the Gaels". The early 13th-century author of  wrote that "the name Arregathel means the margin (i.e., border region) of the Scots or Irish, because all Scots and Irish are generally called Gattheli (i.e. Gaels), from their ancient warleader known as Gaithelglas." The word  also means "coast" when applied to maritime regions, so the name can also be translated as "coast of the Gaels".

History

The Kilmartin Glen has standing stones and other monuments dating back to around 3000BC, and is one of the most significant areas for Neolithic and Bronze Age remains in mainland Scotland. In 563AD Iona Abbey was founded, becoming one of the most important early Christian sites in Scotland.

The Gaelic kingdom of Dál Riata existed between the 5th and 9th centuries. Its territory covered north-eastern parts of Ireland in what later became County Antrim, part of the mainland of Great Britain in what is now western Scotland, and numerous islands in the Inner Hebrides. Dál Riata fragmented in the 9th century during the Viking Age; the part in Ireland was absorbed into the kingdom of Ulaid, the islands came under the control of the Kingdom of the Isles, and the part on mainland Britain was united in 843AD with the Pictish kingdom to its east under Kenneth MacAlpin to become the Kingdom of Alba.

The name Argyll, meaning "coast or borderland of the Gaels", came to be used for the part of the former Dál Riata territory on mainland Britain.

Argyll was divided into several lordships or provinces, including Kintyre, Knapdale, Lorn, Cowal, and a smaller Argyll province which covered the area around Inveraray between Loch Fyne and Loch Awe (the latter sometimes described by later writers as "Argyll proper" or "Mid Argyll" to distinguish it from the wider area). The term "North Argyll" was also used to refer to the area later called Wester Ross. It was called North Argyll as it was settled by missionaries and refugees from Dál Riata, based at the abbey of Applecross. The position of abbot was hereditary, and when Ferchar mac in tSagairt, son of the abbot, became the Earl of Ross in the 13th century, the region of North Argyll gradually became known as Wester Ross instead.

Alba evolved into the kingdom of Scotland, but lost control of Kintyre, Knapdale and Lorn to Norwegian rule, as was acknowledged in a treaty of 1098 between Edgar, King of Scotland and Magnus Barefoot, King of Norway. In 1266 the Treaty of Perth re-established the Scottish crown's authority over the parts of Argyll which had been under Norwegian rule, along with the former Kingdom of the Isles, which together became the semi-independent Lordship of the Isles.

By this time, the rest of the area under Scottish rule was divided into shires, administered by sheriffs. The shires covered different territories to the provinces, and it was the shires which subsequently evolved into Scotland's counties rather than the older provinces. Following the Treaty of Perth, the Argyll provinces were initially placed in the shire of Perth. In 1293 two new shires were created within Argyll; the Sheriff of Kintyre, covering just that province, and the Sheriff of Lorn, covering Lorn, Knapdale, and Mid Argyll (which probably included Cowal at that time).

The earliest reference to a Sheriff of Argyll was in 1326. The position appears to have been a re-establishment or renaming of the position of the Sheriff of Lorn. The post subsequently became a hereditary position held by members of Clan Campbell.

Despite the creation of the shires, much of the area remained under the practical control of the Lord of the Isles until 1476, when John MacDonald, last Lord of the Isles, quitclaimed Kintyre, Knapdale, and Mid Argyll to full Scottish control. In 1481, Knapdale was added to the shire of Kintyre which then became known as Tarbertshire, being initially administered from Tarbert.

The Scottish Reformation coincidentally followed the fall of the Lordship of the Isles. The MacDonalds (the clan of the former Lords of the Isles) were strong supporters of the former religious regime. The Campbells, by contrast, were strong supporters of the reforms. At the start of the 17th century, under instruction from James VI, the Campbells were sent to the MacDonald territory at Islay and Jura, which they subdued and added to the shire of Argyll. Campbell pressure at this time also led to the sheriff court for Tarbertshire being moved to Inverary, where the Campbells held the court for the sheriff of Argyll. Tarbertshire was subsequently abolished by an act of parliament in 1633, being absorbed into the shire of Argyll. The act also confirmed the town of Inveraray's position as "head burgh" of the enlarged shire.

In 1667 Commissioners of Supply were established for each shire, which would serve as the main administrative body for the area until the creation of county councils in 1890.

David II had restored MacDougall authority over Lorn in 1357, but John MacDougall (head of the MacDougalls) had already renounced claims to Mull (in 1354) in favour of the MacDonalds, to avoid potential conflict. The MacLeans were an ancient family based in Lorn (including Mull), and following the quitclaim, they no longer had a Laird in Mull, so themselves became Mull's Lairds. Unlike the MacDonalds, they were fervent supporters of the Reformation, even supporting acts of civil disobedience against king Charles II's repudiation of the Solemn League and Covenant. Archibald Campbell (Earl of Argyll) was instructed by the privy council to seize Mull, and suppress the non-conformist behaviour; by 1680 he gained possession of the island, and transferred shrieval authority to the sheriff of Argyll.

In 1746, following Jacobite insurrections, the Heritable Jurisdictions Act abolished regality, and forbade the position of sheriff from being inherited. Local governance was brought into line with that of the rest of the recently unified Great Britain, and the English term "county" came to be used interchangeably with the term "shire". In 1890, elected county councils were created under the Local Government (Scotland) Act 1889.

The Small Isles of Muck or Muick, Rhum or Rùm, Canna and Sanday were part of the county until they were transferred to Inverness-shire in 1891 by the boundary commission appointed under the Local Government (Scotland) Act 1889. The island of Egg or Eigg was already in Inverness-shire.

Argyll was abolished as a county for local government purposes in 1975, with its area being split between Highland and Strathclyde Regions. A local government district called Argyll and Bute was formed in the Strathclyde region, including most of Argyll and the adjacent Isle of Bute (the former County of Bute was more extensive). The Ardnamurchan, Ardgour, Ballachulish, Duror, Glencoe, Kinlochleven and Morvern areas of Argyll were detached to become parts of Lochaber District, in Highland. They remained in Highland following the 1996 revision.

In 1996 a new unitary council area of Argyll and Bute was created, with a change in boundaries to include part of the former Strathclyde district of Dumbarton. The historic county boundaries of Argyll are still used for some limited official purposes connected with land registration, being a registration county.

County council

Argyll County Council held its first meeting at the courthouse in Inveraray on 22 May 1890, when over three hours were spent debating where the council should meet thereafter, with proposals put forward in favour of meeting in Lochgilphead, Inveraray, Oban, Dunoon, or even Glasgow (despite the latter being outside the county). It was decided to meet at Dunoon between May and September and at Oban for the rest of the year. The council did subsequently hold meetings in more places than just those two towns, meeting occasionally at all the towns which had been suggested at that first meeting.

The council also appointed a clerk who was based in Lochgilphead at its first meeting, beginning the practice of having the council's main offices in that town. The clerk's offices were initially at the County Offices which formed part of Lochgilphead's courthouse and police station on Lochnell Street, which had been built in 1849. In 1925 the council bought the former Argyll Hotel at 5 Lochnell Street for £2,700, converting it to become their offices. The hotel had been built in 1887, and was renamed County Offices. The Lochgilphead building was not large enough to house all the council's staff, and some departments remained in other towns throughout the county council's existence, with the county treasurer being based in Campbeltown, the health department in Oban and the education offices in Dunoon.

After the county council's abolition in 1975 the building at 5 Lochnell Street became the sub-regional office of Strathclyde Regional Council, being renamed "Dalriada House", whilst the new Argyll and Bute District Council established its headquarters at nearby Kilmory Castle.

Geography
Argyllshire is split into two non-contiguous mainland sections divided by Loch Linnhe, plus a large number of islands that fall within the Inner Hebrides. Mainland Argyllshire is characterised by mountainous Highland scenery interspersed with hundreds of lochs, with a heavily indented coastline containing numerous small offshore islands. The islands present a contrasting range of scenery – from the relatively flat islands of Coll and Tiree to the mountainous terrain of Jura and Mull. For ease of reference the following is split into three sections: Mainland (north), Mainland (south) and the Inner Hebrides.

Mainland (north)
The northern mainland section consists of two large peninsulas – Ardnamurchan and Morvern – divided by Loch Sunart, with a large inland section – known traditionally as Ardgour – bounded on the east by Loch Linnhe. This loch gradually narrows, before turning sharply west in the vicinity of Fort William (where it is known as Loch Eil), almost cutting the northern mainland section of Argyll in two. This area, in the vicinity of Fort William and along the railway line, contains the largest towns of northern mainland Argyll.

Ardnamurchan is a remote, mountainous region with only one access road; it terminates in Ardnamurchan Point and Corrachadh Mòr, the westernmost points of the British mainland. In the north-east of the peninsula two unnamed sub-peninsulas almost encircle Kentra Bay, and are bound by the South Channel of Loch Moidart to the north; to the east of this lies the River Shiel and then Loch Shiel, a long loch which forms most of this section of the border with Inverness-shire. Morvern is a large peninsula and like its northern neighbour is remote, mountainous and sparsely populated. In its north-west Loch Teacuis cuts deeply into the peninsula, as does Loch Aline in the south. At the estuary of Loch Teacuis lie the large islands of Oronsay, Risga and Càrna. There are numerous lochs in northern Argyll, the largest being Loch Doilet, Loch Arienas, Loch Teàrnait, Loch Doire nam Mart and Loch Mudle.

List of islands

Am Brican
Ardtoe Island
Big Stirk
Càrna
Dearg Sgeir
Dubh Sgeir
Eilean a' Chuilinn
Eilean a' Mhuirich
Eilean an Fhèidh
Eilean an t-Sionnaich
Eilean Ghleann Fhionainn
Eilean Mhic Dhomhnuill Dhuibh
Eilean mo Shlinneag
Eilean Mòr, Loch Sunart
Eilean Mòr, Loch Sunart (inner)
Eilean na h-Acarseid
Eilean na Beitheiche
Eilean nam Gillean
Eilean nan Eildean
Eilean nan Gabhar
Eilean nan Gall
Eilean Rubha an Ridire
Eilean Uillne
Eileanan Glasa
Eileanan Loisgte
Eileanan nan Gad
Garbh Eilean
Glas Eilean (inner Loch Sunart)
Glas Eilean (outer Loch Sunart)
Glas Eileanan
Little Stirk
Oronsay
Red Rocks
Risga
Seilag
Sgeir an Eididh
Sgeir an t-Seangain
Sgeir Buidhe
Sgeir Charrach
Sgeir Ghobhlach
Sgeir Horsgeat
Sgeir Mhali
Sgeir Mhòr
Sgeir nan Gillean
Sgeirean nan Torran
Sgeirean Shallachain
Sligneach Bag
Sligneach Mòr

Mainland (south)

The southern mainland section is much larger than the northern, and is dominated by the long Kintyre peninsula, the terminus of which lies only  from Northern Ireland on the other side of the North Channel. The coast is complex, with the west coast in particular being heavily indented and containing numerous sea inlets, peninsulas and sub-peninsulas; of the latter, the major ones (north to south) are Appin, Ardchattan, Craignish, Tayvallich, Taynish, Knapdale and Kintyre, and the major loch inlets (north to south) are Loch Leven, Loch Creran, Loch Etive, Loch Feochan, Loch Melfort, Loch Craignish, Loch Crinan, Loch Sween, Loch Caolisport and West Loch Tarbert, the latter dividing Kintyre from Knapdale. To the east Loch Fyne separates Kintyre from the Cowal peninsula, which is itself split into three sub-peninsulas by Lochs Striven and Riddon and split on its east coast by Holy Loch and Loch Goil; south across the Kyles of Bute lies the island of Bute, which is part of Buteshire, and to east across Loch Long lies the Rosneath peninsula in Dunbartonshire. The topography of south Argyll is in general heavily mountainous and sparsely populated, with numerous lochs; Kintyre is slightly flatter though still hilly. Near Glen Coe can be found Bidean nam Bian, the tallest peak in the county at 1,150 m (3,770 ft). Of the lochs and bodies of water the largest are (roughly north to south) the Blackwater Reservoir, Loch Achtriochtan, Loch Laidon, Loch Bà, loch Buidhe, Lochan na Stainge, Loch Dochard, Loch Tulla, Lochan Shira, the Cruachan Reservoir, Loch Restil, Loch Awe, Loch Avich, Blackmill Loch, Loch Nant, Loch Nell, Loch Scammadale, Loch Glashan, Loch Loskin, Loch Eck, Asgog Loch, Loch Tarsan, Càm Loch, Loch nan Torran, Loch Ciàran, Loch Garasdale, Lussa Loch and Tangy Loch.

List of islands
Note that islands lying off the west coast are generally considered to be part of the Inner Hebrides (see below)

Abbot's Isle
An Oitir
Barmore Island
Black Islands
Burnt Islands (comprising Eilean Mòr, Eilean Fraoich and Eilean Buidhe)
Island Davaar
Duncuan Island
Eilean a' Chòmhraidh
Eilean an t-Sagairt
Eilean Aoghainn
Eilean Beith
Eilean Buidhe
Eilean Dubh
Eilean Grianain
Eilean Math-ghamhna
Eilean Mòr
Eilean Munde
Eilean nam Meann
Glas Eilean
Gluniform Island
Henrietta Reef
Inis Chonain
Inishail
Innis Errich
Island Ross
Liath Eilean
Oitir Mòr
Sanda Island
Scart Rocks
Sgat Beag
Sgat Mòr
Sgeir Bhuide
Sgeir Caillich
Sgeir Lag Choan
Sgeir Leathann
Sgeir Mhaola Cin
Sgeir na Dubhaidh
Sgeir Port a' Ghuail
Sheep Island
Thorn Isle

Inner Hebrides
Argyllshire contains the majority of the Inner Hebrides group, with the notable exceptions of Skye and Eigg (both in Inverness-shire). The islands are too geographically diverse to be summarised here; further details can be found on the individual pages below.

List of islands

Am Fraoch Eilean
An Dubh Sgeir
An Stèidh
Bach Island
Balach Rocks
Belnahua
Bernera Island
Brosdale Island
Calve Island
Canna
Cara Island
Carraig an Daimh
Carsaig Island
Coiresa
Coll
Colonsay
Craro Island
Island of Danna
Dubh Artach
Dubh Sgeir
Eagamol
Eag na Maoile
Easdale
Eilean a' Chalmain
Eilean a' Chùirn
Eilean a' Mhadaidh
Eilean Àird nan Uan
Eilean an Aodaich
Eilean an Fhuarain
Eileach an Naoimh
Eilean Annraidh
Eilean an Righ
Eilean Arsa
Eilean Ascaoineach
Eilean Balnagowan
Eilean Bàn
Eilean Bhrìde
Eilean Coltair
Eilean Craobhach
Eilean dà Ghallagain
Eilean dà Mhèinn
Eilean Dioghlum
Eilean Dùin
Eilean Fraoich
Eilean Gainimh
Eilean Garbh
Eilean Ghòmain
Eilean Ghreasamuill
Eilean Imersay
Eilean Inshaig
Eilean Loain
Eilean Loch Oscair
Eilean Mhartan
Eilean Mhic Chrion
Eilean Mhic Coinnich
Eilean Mòr
Eilean Musdile
Eilean na Cloiche
Eilean na Cille
Eilean na Creiche
Eilean na h-Eairne
Eilean na h-Uamha
Eilean na Seamair
Eilean nam Ban
Eilean nam Muc
Eilean nan Caorach
Eilean nan Coinean
Eilean nan Each
Eilean nan Gamhna
Eilean Odhar
Eilean Ona
Eilean Ornsay
Eilean Ramsay
Eilean Reilean
Eilean Righ
Eilean Tràighe
Eileanan Glasa
Eileanan na h-Aoran
Eorsa
Erisgeir
Eriska
Erraid
Fladda
Frenchman's Rocks
Gamhna Gigha
Gamhnach Mhòr
Garbh Rèisa
Garbh Sgeir
Garvellachs
Gigalum Island
Gigha
Gòdag
Gometra
Guirasdeal
Hàslam
Humla
Inch Kenneth
Inn Island
Insh Island
Iona
Island Macaskin
Islay
Hough Skerries
Hyskeir (in Gaelic, Oigh-Sgeir)
Jura
Kerrera
Lady's Rock
Liath Sgeir
Lismore
Little Colonsay
Luing
Lunga
MacCormaig Isles
Maisgeir
Muck
Na Sgeiran Mòra
Nave Island
Ormsa
Oronsay
Orsay
Rèidh Eilean
Rèisa an t-Struith
Rèisa Mhic Phaidean
Ruadh Sgeir
Rùm
Samalan Island
Sanday
Scarba
Scoul Eilean
Seil
Sgeir a' Mhàim-àrd
Sgeir a' Phuirt
Sgeir an Ròin
Sgeiran Mòra
Sgeir Mhòr
Sgeir na Caillich
Sgeir nan Gobhar
Sgeir nan Sgarbh
Sgeir Shealg
Sgeir Tràighe
Shian Island
Shuna, Slate Islands
Shuna Island, Loch Linnhe
Skerryvore
Small Isles
Soa, near Coll
Soa, Tiree
Soa, near Mull
Staffa
Taynish Island
Sùil Ghorm
Texa
Tiree
Torran Rocks
Torsa
Treshnish Isles
Ulva

Constituency 
Starting in 1590, as one of the measures that followed the Scottish reformation, each sheriffdom elected commissioners to the Parliament of Scotland. As well as the commissioner representing Argyll, at least one was sent to represent Tarbertshire, Sir Lachlan Maclean of Morvern. In the 1630 parliamentary session, Sir Coll Lamont, laird of Lamont, was the commissioner for "Argyll and Tarbert".

There was an Argyllshire constituency of the Parliament of Great Britain from 1708 to 1801, and of the Parliament of the United Kingdom from 1801 to 1983 (renamed Argyll in 1950). The Argyll and Bute constituency was created when the Argyll constituency was abolished.

Civil parishes
Civil parishes are still used for some statistical purposes, and separate census figures are published for them. As their areas have been largely unchanged since the 19th century, this allows for comparison of population figures over an extended period of time.

Ardchattan and Muckairn
Ardgour
Ardrishaig
Ardnamurchan
Campbeltown
Coll
Colonsay and Oronsay
Craignish
Dunoon and Kilmun
Gigha and Cara Island
 Glassary
Glen Orchy and Inishail
Inveraray 
 Inverchaolain
Jura
 Kilbrandon and Kilchattan
 Kilcalmonell
 Kilchoman
 Kilchrenan and Dalavich
 Kildalton
 Kilfinan
 Kilfinichen and Kilvickeon
 Killarow and Kilmeny
 Killean and Kilchenzie
Kilmallie (part)
Kilmartin
Kilmodan
 Kilmore and Kilbride
 Kilninian and Kilmore
 Kilninver and Kilmelford
Lismore and Appin
Lochgilphead
Lochgoilhead and Kilmorich
Morvern
North Knapdale
Saddell and Skipness
South Knapdale
Southend
Strachur
 Strathlachlan
Tiree
 Torosay, Mull

Settlements

Mainland (north)

Acharacle
Achaphubuil
Ardery
Ardgour
Ardtoe
Banavie
Blaich
Bonnavoulin
Caol
Clovullin
Corpach
Corran
Duisky
Fassfern
Glenborrodale
Kentra
Kilchoan
Kilmory
Kinlocheil
Laga
Lochaline
Melfort
Newton of Ardtoe
Ockle
Polloch
Portuairk
Resipole
Salen
South Garvan
Stronchreggan
Strontian
Trislaig

Mainland (south)

Achahoish
Achinhoan
Achnamara
Ardentinny
Ardgartan
Ardnadam
Ardrishaig
Ardtaraig
Ardulaine
Arrochar
Ballachulish
Barcaldine
Bellochantuy
Benderloch
Blairmore
Cairndow
Campbeltown
Carradale
Carrick Castle
Clachaig
Clachan
Clachan of Glendaruel
Claonaig
Colintraive
Connel
Coylet
Craobh Haven
Crinan
Dalavich
Dalmally
Dippen
Drumlemble
Dumbeg
Dunoon
Duror
Ford
Furnace
Glenbarr
Glenbranter
Glencoe
Glendaruel
Grogport
Hunters Quay
Innellan
Inveraray
Inverchaolain
Invercreran
Kames
Kennacraig
Kentallen
Kilberry
Kilchenzie
Kilkerran
Kilmanshenachan
Kilmelford
Kilmore
Kilmun
Kinlochleven
Kirn
Knipoch
Largiemore
Lochgair
Lochgilphead
Lochgoilhead
Machrihanish
Millhouse
Muasdale
North Connel
Oban
Ormsary
Otter Ferry
Peninver
Port Ann
Port Appin
Portavadie
Rashfield
St Catherines
Saddell
Sandbank
Skipness
Southend
Stewarton
Strachur
Strone
Succoth
Tarbert
Tayinloan
Taynuilt
Tayvallich
Tighnabruaich
Torinturk
Torrisdale
Tullochgorm
Whistlefield
Whitehouse

Inner Hebrides

Ardbeg (Islay)
Ardfernal (Jura)
Ardilistry (Islay)
Ardmenish (Jura)
Ardtalla (Islay)
Ardtun (Mull)
Arinagour (Coll)
Ballygrant (Islay)
Bowmore (Islay)
Bridgend (Islay)
Bruichladdich (Islay)
Bunessan (Mull)
Bunnahabhain (Islay)
Calgary (Mull)
Craighouse (Jura)
Craignure (Mull)
Dervaig (Mull)
Feolin (Jura)
Fionnphort (Mull)
Fishnish (Mull)
Kilchoman (Islay)
Kinloch (Rùm)
Kintra (Mull)
Knockan (Mull)
Lagavulin (Islay)
Laphroaig (Islay)
Lochbuie (Mull)
Nerabus (Islay)
Pennyghael (Mull)
Port Askaig (Islay)
Port Charlotte (Islay)
Port Ellen (Islay)
Port Mòr (Muck)
Portnahaven (Islay)
Port Wemyss (Islay)
Salen (Mull)
Scalasaig (Colonsay)
Scarinish (Tiree)
Tiroran (Mull)
Tobermory (Mull)
Uisken (Mull)
Ulva Ferry (Mull)

Transport

The West Highland railway runs through the far north of the county, stopping at Locheilside, Loch Eil Outward Bound, Corpach and Banavie, before carrying on to Mallaig in Inverness-shire. A branch of the line also goes to Oban, calling at Dalmally, Loch Awe, Falls of Cruachan, Taynuilt and Connel Ferry.

Numerous ferries link the islands of the Inner Hebrides to each other and the Scottish mainland. Many of the islands also contain small airstrips enabling travel by air. A fairly extensive bus network links the larger towns of the area, with bus transport also available on the islands of Islay, Jura and Mull.

The county contains a number of small airports which serve the region and Edinburgh/Glasgow: Oban, Tiree, Coll, Colonsay, Campbeltown and Islay.

Kintyre has been one of the mooted locations for a proposed British-Irish bridge; as the closest point to Ireland at first glance it appears to be the most obvious route, however Kintyre is hampered by its remoteness from the main centres of Scotland's population.

Residents

Clans
Clan Campbell was the main clan of this region. The Campbell clan hosted the long line of the Dukes of Argyll.
Clan MacIntyre historically held lands in this region and had close ties with Clan Campbell. 
Clan Gregor historically held a great deal of lands in this region prior to the proscription of their name in April 1603, the result of a power struggle with the Campbells.
Clan Lamont historically both allied and feuded with the Campbell clan, culminating in the Dunoon Massacre. In the 19th century, theclan chief sold his lands and relocated to Australia, where the current chief lives.
Clan McCorquodale held lands around Loch Awe from the early medieval period until the early 18th century. Their seat was a castle on Loch Tromlee.
Clan MacMillan held lands in Argyll, notably in knapdale (viz. "MacMillan of Knap")
Clan Malcolm Also known as MacCallum. The Malcolm clan seat is Duntrune Castle on the banks of Loch Crinan
Clan MacLean Historically held lands on the Isle of Mull with its seat at Duart Castle
Clan MacLachlan historically feuded with the Campbells, and espoused Jacobitism. Held lands on both sides of Loch Fyne, with its seat in Strathlachlan
Clan MacEwan historically feuded with the Campbells, cousins of MacLachlans. Held lands in Kilfinan.

Other notable residents
Patrick MacKellar, (17171778), born in Argyll, military engineer, achieved his reputation on projects in the United States of America.
Baron Robertson of Port Ellen KT, GCMG, FRSA, FRSE, PC (born 12 April 1946, George Islay MacNeill Robertson), British Labour politician and tenth Secretary General of the North Atlantic Treaty Organisation
Eric Blair, better known as George Orwell, who resided in the northernmost part of Jura, during the final years of his life (1946-1950). During this period, he wrote Nineteen Eighty-Four.
Karen Matheson, folk singer, grew up in Taynuilt.
Frances Ruth Shand Kydd (née Roche; 20 January 1936 – 3 June 2004) was the mother of Diana, Princess of Wales. She was resident at Ardencaple House on the Island of Seil.  She was buried in Pennyfuir Cemetery on the outskirts of Oban.
Mike Lindup, keyboardist, vocalist and songwriter most famous for being a member of Level 42

In fiction 
 Rosemary Sutcliff's novel The Mark of the Horse Lord (1965) is set in Earra Gael, i.e. the Coast of the Gael, wherein the Dal Riada undergo an internal struggle for control of royal succession, and an external conflict to defend their frontiers against the Caledones.
 The highlands above the village of Lochgilphead were used for a scene in the 1963 film From Russia with Love, starring Sean Connery as James Bond. He killed two villains in a helicopter by firing gunshots at them.
 The main focus of the song "The Queen of Argyll" is that of a beautiful woman, from Argyll. The song was sung by the band Silly Wizard and covered by Fiddler's Green in 2000.
 The 1985 Scottish movie Restless Natives used Lochgoilhead to film a chase scene, as well as some roads just outside the village.
 The housekeeper Elsie Carson in Julian Fellowes' television drama Downton Abbey is from Argyll.
  In Harry Potter and the Prisoner of Azkaban, after being attacked by Sirius Black, the Fat Lady is found hiding in a map of Argyllshire that is located on the second floor in Hogwarts.
  In Hogwarts Legacy, there is a map on a wall inside the castle above the first floor of the south wing. Using the revelio spell reveals a page for the field guide saying, "This map depicts Argyllshire, a region in Scotland which contains the Hebrides  - native home of the Hebrideon dragon."

See also
 Argyle pattern
 Medieval Diocese of Argyll
 Duke of Argyll
 List of counties of Scotland 1890–1975

Notes

References

Bibliography 
 .

Further reading
 The Imperial gazetteer of Scotland Vol. I. page 78, by Rev. John Marius Wilson.

External links
 Map of Argyllshire on Wikishire
  "Filming locations", From Russia with Love (1963), IMDB
 Argyll.org – Argyll Independent Visitor Information
 Argyll and Argyle Visitor Information
 Visitor information for Inveraray, Tarbert, Knapdale, Crinan and Lochgilphead

 
Counties of Scotland
Counties of the United Kingdom (1801–1922)